Chen Tung-jung is a Taiwanese politician.

Chen attended the Taipei University of Marine Technology.

He moved to the United States, and became active in the Taiwanese American Association, serving as president of the Southern California branch and vice president at the national level. Chen was also an adviser and secretary-general of the World Federation of Taiwanese Associations. Chen took office as a member of the Legislative Yuan on 11 June 2007, following Winston Dang's appointment as head of the Environmental Protection Administration. Chen's legislative tenure ended following the 2008 legislative election.

References

Living people
Taiwanese emigrants to the United States
American emigrants to Taiwan
Democratic Progressive Party Members of the Legislative Yuan
Party List Members of the Legislative Yuan
Members of the 6th Legislative Yuan
Date of birth missing (living people)
Year of birth missing (living people)